Maple Mountain is a mountain located in Okanogan County in the U.S. state of Washington. The mountain is mostly treed except for the South side, which has exposed slab, with grasses growing in some areas. This is the most technical route possible, and requires some rock scrambling. The easiest route up the mountain, is the Maple Mountain trail. The trail  climbs 1420 vertical feet from Granite Creek to just below the summit in only .

References

Mountains of Washington (state)
Mountains of Okanogan County, Washington